The Department of Public Health (Myanmar) is part of the Ministry of Health and Sports (Myanmar). The Department has five main Units.
 Director-General's office
 Disease Control
 Public Health
 Disaster
 Admin and Finance
Each unit has divisions. Each division has a Director, Deputy Director, Assistant Director, Medical Officer, Health Assistants (HA) and others.

Units

Disease Control
 Malaria Control Division
 Tuberculosis (TB) Control Division
 Leprosy Control Division
 Trachoma Control Division
 HIV Control Division

Public Health
 Maternal and Reproductive Health
 Child Health Division
 School Health Knowledge Promotion Division
 Health Promotion Division
 Health Education Division
 Nutrition Division
 Occupational Health Division
 Environmental Health Division

Disaster
 Central Epidemiology Unit
 Non-communicable Diseases Control
 Expanded Programme on Immunization (EPI)
 Disaster Management Division

Admin and Finance
 Administration Division
 Finance Division
 Procurement and Supply Division
 Planning Division
 Health Management Information System (HMIS)
 Inspection Division

See also
 Health in Myanmar
 HIV/AIDS in Myanmar

References

Medical and health organisations based in Myanmar